Pongamiopsis pervilleana is a species of legume in the family Fabaceae. It is found only in Madagascar.

References

Millettieae
Endemic flora of Madagascar
Least concern plants
Taxonomy articles created by Polbot
Taxa named by René Viguier
Taxa named by Henri Ernest Baillon